Major Joseph Haythorne Reed (1828 – 6 April 1858) was a British Whig politician.

Reed was elected Whig MP for Abingdon at a by-election in 1854—caused by the succession of Montagu Bertie to Earl of Abingdon—and held the seat until 1857 when he sought election unsuccessfully at Finsbury.

References

External links
 

UK MPs 1852–1857
1828 births
1858 deaths
Whig (British political party) MPs for English constituencies